Events from the year 1700 in Canada.

Incumbents
 French Monarch: Louis XIV
 English, Scottish and Irish Monarch: William III

Governors
 Governor General of New France: Louis-Hector de Callière
 Governor of Acadia: Claude-Sébastien de Villieu
 Colonial Governor of Louisiana: Sauvolle
 Governor of Plaisance: Joseph de Monic

Events
 January 26,1700- The Cascadia earthquake, one of the largest earthquakes on record, ruptures the Cascadia subduction zone offshore from Vancouver Island to northern California, creating a tsunami that wiped out the winter village of Pachena Bay leaving no survivors.

Full date unknown
 By now, it is clear that New France is not going to be self-sufficient.
 Population of Acadia is 1,400.
 Sir Stephen Evans is Governor of the Hudson's Bay Company between the years 1700 to 1712.

Births
 June 17 - François-Marie Bissot, Sieur de Vincennes, explorer and soldier. (died 1736)

Full date unknown
 Joseph Adams, chief factor of the Hudson's Bay Company. (died 1737)

Deaths
January 12 - Marguerite Bourgeoys (born Troyes, France on April 17, 1620), a first school teacher in Montreal and founder of the congregation of Notre Dame (the first order of uncloistered nuns in North America).

Full date unknown
Louis Jolliet was one of the first people of European descent born in North America to be remembered for significant discoveries. (born 1645)

See also
List of years in Canada

References